Thatha Shamsa Chattha is a small village in the Hafizabad District of Punjab, Pakistan. It is located at an altitude of 210 metres (692 feet). It is the oldest village, believed to date to the Mughal era.

It consists of approximately 200 homes and 1500 people. Thatha Shamsa is situated on the bank of a canal that originates in the Headqadirabad Colony. Most of the land suffers from seams, making it unsuitable for cultivation, which caused many villagers to move to cities for work or to convert their lands into fish farms, which are now numerous in and around the village.

Thatha Shamsa is bounded by rivers and canals. The major canal that originates from the Chenab River at Qadirabad barrage is just west of the village, and the village is often threatened by floods during the monsoon season. The weather is usually ruthless and intolerable in the summer and winter but is amazing in the autumn and spring. The village is normally dry throughout the year.

References

Villages in Hafizabad District
Hafizabad District